Sergio Aquino (born 21 September 1979 in Clorinda, Formosa) is a Paraguayan football player of Argentine descent who currently plays for Paraguayan side Club Libertad. He has formerly played for Cerro Porteño and Olimpia of Asunción. He has also represented the Paraguay national team in international games between 2008 and the present day.

See also
 Players and Records in Paraguayan Football

External links

1979 births
Living people
People from Clorinda, Formosa
Argentine footballers
Paraguayan footballers
Paraguay international footballers
Paraguayan Primera División players
Cerro Porteño players
Club Olimpia footballers
Club Libertad footballers
Association football midfielders